Chemokine (C-X-C motif) ligand 7 (CXCL7) is a human gene.

The encoded protein, Chemokine (C-X-C motif) ligand is a small cytokine belonging to the CXC chemokine family. It is an isoform of Beta-Thromboglobulin or Pro-Platelet basic protein (PPBP).

It is a protein that is released in large amounts from platelets following their activation. It stimulates various processes including mitogenesis, synthesis of extracellular matrix, glucose metabolism and synthesis of plasminogen activator.

References

Further reading

External links
 

Cytokines